Locard is a surname and may refer to:

 Arnould Locard, Étienne Alexandre Arnould Locard (1841-1904), French malacologist
 Edmond Locard (1877–1966), French forensic scientist
 Locard's exchange principle, developed by Edmond Locard
 Sir Simon Locard, 2nd of Lee (1300–1371), Scottish knight